Super Bases Loaded is a baseball video game produced by Jaleco for the Super Nintendo Entertainment System in 1991. It is the fifth overall installment of the Bases Loaded series, and first installment of the secondary series for the Super NES. This game was originally released in Japan under the title  in Japan.

The North American version includes a sponsorship from Ryne Sandberg, like Bases Loaded 3 for the NES.

Professional teams
 Atlanta Amoebas
 Boston Buzzards
 Chicago Cyclops
 New York Mercs
 Philadelphia Hawks
 Washington Weasels
 Hawaii Islanders
 Kansas City Kings
 Los Angeles Lizards
 Seattle Storm
 Texas Tornados
 Utah Stars

The player can also edit their own team in this game.

Reception

David Upchurch of ACE praised the gameplay but was critical of the graphics and sound. Ashley Summers of Raze considered the baseball players to be realistically drawn and animated, but wrote that the crowd "looks like mush". Summers praised the music, but criticized the "muffled and repetitive" dialogue. Chris Rice of N-Force praised the gameplay and sound effects, but concluded that it was a "good game let down by poor graphics and an unfinished look!"

See also
Super Professional Baseball II

References

1991 video games
Bases Loaded video games
City Connection franchises
Jaleco games
Super Nintendo Entertainment System games
Super Nintendo Entertainment System-only games
Tose (company) games
Multiplayer and single-player video games
Video games developed in Japan